Events from the year 1690 in England.

Incumbents
 Monarchs – William III and Mary II
 Parliament – Convention of 1689 (until 6 February), 2nd of William and Mary (starting 20 March)

Events
 7 January – the first recorded full peal is rung, at St Sepulchre-without-Newgate in the City of London, marking a new era in change ringing.
 March – London, Quo Warranto Judgment Reversed Act 1689 ("An Act for Reversing the Judgment in a Quo Warranto against the City of London and for Restoreing the City of London to its antient Rights and Privileges") passed by Parliament.
 20 May – the Act of Grace passed, forgiving followers of the deposed James II.
 30 June – War of the Grand Alliance: Battle of Beachy Head: French naval victory over the English and Dutch.
 1 July (O.S.) – Battle of the Boyne in Ireland: William III defeats the deposed James II who returns to exile in France.
 25 July – War of the Grand Alliance: French raiders burn Teignmouth in Devon.
 24 August – in India, Sutanuti – which later becomes Kolkata – is founded by Job Charnock of the English East India Company.
 December – earliest recorded sighting of the planet Uranus, by John Flamsteed, who mistakenly catalogues it as the star 34 Tauri.
 10 December – playwright Henry Nevil Payne is tortured for his role in the Montgomery Plot to restore James II to the throne, the last time a political prisoner is subjected to torture in Britain.
 Quakers John Freame and Thomas Gould form a partnership as bankers in the City of London, origin of Barclays.
 Probable date – planting of Hampton Court Maze.

Publications
 An Essay Concerning Human Understanding by John Locke (dated this year but published in 1689).
 Political Arithmetic by William Petty.

Births
 3 February – Richard Rawlinson, minister and antiquarian (died 1755)
 12 March – George Lee, 2nd Earl of Lichfield (died 1742)
 22 April
 John Carteret, 2nd Earl Granville, statesman (died 1763)
 (baptised) – Robert Raikes the Elder, printer (died 1757)
 29 October – Martin Folkes, English antiquarian (died 1754)
 1 December – Philip Yorke, 1st Earl of Hardwicke, Lord Chancellor (died 1764)
 2 December – Robert Shafto, Member of Parliament (died 1729)
 date unknown
 Charles Bridgeman, garden designer (died 1738)
 Hester Santlow, dancer and actress (died 1773)

Deaths
 4 February – Sir John Child, 1st Baronet, governor of Bombay (year of birth unknown)
 7 February – Sir William Morice, 1st Baronet, Royalist statesman (born c.1628)
 March – Sir Philip Parker, 1st Baronet, Member of Parliament (born c. 1625)
 21 May – John Eliot, Puritan missionary to Native Americans, died in Massachusetts Bay Colony (born 1604)
 12 July – George Walker, soldier, killed in action at the Battle of the Boyne (born (1645)
 9 October – Henry FitzRoy, 1st Duke of Grafton, illegitimate son of King Charles II, military commander, died of wounds received at Siege of Cork (born 1663)
 15 October – Thomas and Ann Rogers, counterfeiters, executed
 By 10 December – Sir Richard Willis, 1st Baronet, Royalist double agent (born 1614)
 15 December – Sir Thomas Allen, 1st Baronet, Member of Parliament (born c. 1633)

References

 
Years of the 17th century in England